Owusu Dako (born 23 May 1973) is a British sprinter. He competed in the men's 200 metres at the 1996 Summer Olympics.

References

1973 births
Living people
Athletes (track and field) at the 1996 Summer Olympics
British male sprinters
Olympic athletes of Great Britain
Sportspeople from Accra